The Beijing Wushu Team is a world-renowned wushu team from Beijing, China. The team has produced many famous international stars such as Jet Li, Donnie Yen, Hao Zhihua, Huang Qiuyan, Zhang Hongmei and Wu Jing. The Beijing team members also work with movie producers to make films. Aside from Jet Li, many other athletes have also been featured in movies (e.g. Wang Jue has starred in Shaolin Temple.) Every year, the Beijing Team performs demonstrations of wushu for the citizens of Beijing as well as visiting dignitaries. They have performed for former US President Jimmy Carter as well as many other foreign heads of state when they visited Beijing.

History

The Beijing Wushu School was created in order to prepare the city of Beijing for the first National Games of China in 1959.  Beijing Sports University (now Beijing Physical Education University) wushu department graduate Liu Peiwei was appointed the team leader and coach. In 1974, the school was reformed as the Beijing Wushu Team in November 1974 by Wu Bin and Li Junfeng. Since then it has been based at the Shichahai Sports School.

In the nearly three decades since its founding and through the hard work of the athletes and coaches, the team has achieved remarkable levels of success. From 1974 to 1997, they won the National team championship 11 times. From 1975 to 1985, the Beijing Wushu Team achieved a feat that no team has ever accomplished, before or since – winning the championship for ten consecutive years. The Beijing Wushu Team received 40 individual gold medals during this 10-year reign.

Many of the earlier generations of Beijing Wushu Team athletes have gone on to teach wushu abroad. Many have emigrated to the US, Australia, Japan and other parts of Asia.

Members

First Generation Beijing Wushu team 
Coaches

 Wu, Bin Beijing, China
 Li, Jun Feng TX, USA
 Cheng, Hui Kun Beijing, China

Men's Team Members

 Li, Jin Heng: Arizona, USA
 Yan, Ping: Beijing, China
 Dong, Hong Lin: Beijing, China
 Wang, Qun: Beijing, China 1960 - 2008
 Sun, Jian Ming: Tokyo, Japan
 Wang, Jian Jun: Tokyo, Japan
 Li, Zhi Zhou: Singapore
 Yang, Yong Li: Beijing, China
 Yu, Shao Wen: Oregon, USA
 Cui, Ya Hui: Beijing, China
 Li, Lian Jie: (Jet Li) Shanghai, China
 Tang, Lai: Wei Australia

Women's Team Members

 Li, Xia: Tokyo, Japan
 Ge, Chun Yan: Singapore
 Mi, Jin bei: Beijing, China
 Zhang, De Hua: Beijing, China 1960 -2008
 Zhou, Jing Ping: California, USA
 Huang, Xiao Feng: Beijing, China
 Zhang, Gui Feng: Maryland, USA
 Hao, Zhi Hua: California, USA
 Zhang, Hong Mei: California, USA
 Huang, Qiu Yan: California, USA
 Wang, Xiu Ping: Beijing, China
 Hui, Xu Na: Beijing, China
 Lu, Yan: Beijing, China

Beijing Wushu Team Performance Tours

The team has showcased its skills through the Beijing Wushu Team Tour many times over the years.  The worldwide tours showcase a mix of veteran athletes and rising stars demonstrating their very best routines.

1974 Tour 
The Beijing Wushu Team's debut world tour in 1974 is often as the beginning of modern wushu in the west. During this tour, Jet Li was reputed to have performed a two-man fight for US President Richard Nixon on the White House lawn. According to Li,  he was asked by Nixon to be his personal bodyguard. Li replied, "I don't want to protect any individual. When I grow up, I want to defend my one billion Chinese countrymen!"

Other Tours 
In 1995 they performed in Los Angeles, San Diego, San Francisco, Berkeley, CA and Calgary, Alberta, Canada. In 1999 they were invited to perform at Arnold Schwarzenegger's Annual Arnold Classic. The team performed and served as judges for the 1998 and 1999 Intercollegiate Wushu Championships (now known as the Collegiate Wushu Tournament) in America as well. In early 1999 they performed in Hawaii during a tribute to Jackie Chan. The 2005 tour saw the team performing in Washington DC, Houston, San Francisco and Los Angeles. In January 2012, the team returned to the United States with a limited four show tour in the San Francisco Bay area.

References

External links
 Beijingwushuteam.com - unofficial website with information about the Beijing Team and Wushu
 History of the Beijing Wushu Team
 Beijing Wushu Team 2005 Tour
 Beijing Wushu Team 2005 Photo Galleries
 Beijing Wushu Team 2012 Tour Site

1974 establishments in China
Sports entertainment
Articles containing video clips
Wushu organizations